The following is a list of Miss Universe titleholders from the competition's inaugural edition in 1952 to present.

Miss Universe titleholders
† = deceased

Notes:

Countries by number of wins

Continents by number of wins

Assumed wins 
Titles assumed following resignations.

Resigned wins

Winners gallery

See also
 List of Miss Universe runners-up and finalists
 List of Miss Earth titleholders
 List of Miss International titleholders
 List of Miss World titleholders
 Big Four international beauty pageants

References

External links

Miss Universe titleholders
Miss Universe titleholders